Nicocles (Nikokles) may refer to:

 Nicocles of Salamis (reigned from 374/3 BC), king of Salamis in Cyprus
 Nicocles of Paphos (d. 306 BC), king of Paphos in Cyprus
 Nicocles of Sicyon (reigned 251 BC), tyrant of Sicyon
 Nicocles (fly), a genus of robber flies